Wong Yat-fei (born August 19, 1946) is a Hong Kong cinema actor who has acted in numerous Cantonese films. Wong is best known for his role as Iron Head in Shaolin Soccer for which he won popular awards. He has appeared in more than 139 films in his career thus far.

Selected filmography

Films 
 Shaolin Soccer
 Kung Fu Dunk
 Beauty and the Breast
 My Kung-Fu Sweetheart
 Love Me, Love My Money
 Forbidden City Cop
 Hail the Judge
 The Royal Scoundrel
 Justice, My Foot!
Out of the Dark (1995)
 Magic Barber (2015)
 Lovely Devil (2015)
 Insomnia Lover (2016)
 Witch Walker (2018)

TV 
 Mutual Affection (1996)
 State of Divinity (1996)
 The Hitman Chronicles (1997)
 Young Hero Fong Sai Yuk (1999)
 [[The Duke of the Mount Deer 2000]] (2000)
 Chess Warriors (2001)
 Kung Fu Soccer (2004)
 Hail The Judge (2006)
 Justice, My Foot (TV series) (2012)

References

External links

Living people
Hong Kong male film actors
Hong Kong male comedians
20th-century Hong Kong male actors
21st-century Hong Kong male actors
1946 births